Rendezvous in Paris (French: Rendez-vous à Paris) is a 1947 French comedy film directed by Gilles Grangier and starring Annie Ducaux, Claude Dauphin and Marguerite Moreno. It was shot at the Studio François 1 in Paris. The film's sets were designed by the art director Roland Quignon.

Synopsis
While travelling of a liner famous singer Catherine Laurence encounter a fellow passenger and falls in love. However, it soon appears that he isn't all that he claims to be.

Cast
 Annie Ducaux as Catherine Laurence
 Claude Dauphin as Robert Chesnay aka Michel Trévines
 Marguerite Moreno as Honorine Leclercq
 Jean Debucourt as Raymond Aubour
 Marcel Vallée as 	Raoul Bedeau
 Gabrielle Robinne as 	Lady Mermor
 Daniel Lecourtois as 	Le commissaire du bord
 Paul Faivre as 	M. Dumas
 André Chanu as 	Me Villerose
 Odette Talazac as 	Mme Gomez
 André Wasley as 	Martinez 
 Robert Balpo as 	Moussinot 
 Jacques Berlioz as 	Morazini aka Van Goolart
 Marcel Charvey as 	Canet
 Jean Tissier as 	Ménil
 Jacqueline Carrel as 	Mlle Gomez

References

Bibliography
 Rège, Philippe. Encyclopedia of French Film Directors, Volume 1. Scarecrow Press, 2009.

External links 
 

1947 films
French comedy films
1940s French-language films
1947 comedy films
Films set in Paris
Films directed by Gilles Grangier
1940s French films